National Route 408 is a national highway of Japan connecting the cities of Narita, Chiba and Takanezawa, Tochigi, with a total length of 116.9 km (72.64 mi).

References

408
Roads in Chiba Prefecture
Roads in Ibaraki Prefecture
Roads in Tochigi Prefecture